Waterman, also known as Waterman Flat, is an unincorporated community in Wheeler County, in the U.S. state of Oregon. Waterman lies southeast of Richmond and northeast of Mitchell at the intersection of Richmond Road, Parrish Creek Road, and Waterman Road. The cattle-ranching community had a post office from 1887 to 1944. Caleb N. Thornburg was the first postmaster.

In the late 19th century, Waterman Flat was a stagecoach stop with a hotel and a livery stable. By 1975, the ruins of a barn were all that remained.

References

1887 establishments in Oregon
Ghost towns in Oregon
Populated places established in 1887
Unincorporated communities in Oregon
Unincorporated communities in Wheeler County, Oregon